Presidential elections were held in El Salvador in January 1895. Provisional president General Rafael Antonio Gutiérrez was the only candidate and was elected with only 91 votes against. Separate elections were held for the vice presidency, in which Prudencio Alfaro defeated Carlos Meléndez and four minor candidates.

Results

President

Vice President

References

El Salvador
1890s in El Salvador
Election and referendum articles with incomplete results
Presidential elections in El Salvador
Single-candidate elections